Katie Lee Davis (born July 25, 1986) is an American Paralympic judoka who competes in international level events. She is a double Parapan American Games medalist and a World silver medalist in the heavyweight category.

References

1986 births
Living people
Sportspeople from Sacramento, California
Paralympic judoka of the United States
Judoka at the 2012 Summer Paralympics
Medalists at the 2011 Parapan American Games
Medalists at the 2015 Parapan American Games
California State University, Sacramento alumni